Rick G. Nelson (born June 11, 1954) is an American politician who served as a member of the Kentucky House of Representatives for the 87th district from January 2001 to January 2019.

He ran for Kentucky state treasurer in the 2015 elections to succeed term-limited Democratic incumbent Todd Hollenbach, but lost to Republican Allison Ball.

Education
Nelson was born in Black Star Coal Camp, Kentucky. He earned a Bachelor of Science degree from Cumberland College (now the University of the Cumberlands) and a Master of Arts from Eastern Kentucky University.

Elections
2018: Nelson did not file to run for re-election, deciding to retire.
2016: Nelson was unopposed for the May 17, 2016 Democratic primary and won the November 8, 2016 general election with 7,224 votes (51.50%) against Republican nominee Chad Shannon.
2015: Nelson filed to run for Kentucky State Treasurer on November 20, 2014. Nelson was part of a five candidate Democratic Primary on May 19, 2015. Nelson would win the primary with 44,397 votes over second place finisher Neville Blakemore's 36,663 votes. Nelson lost the November 3, 2015 general election to Republican nominee Alison Ball with 571,455 votes (60.5%) to Nelson's 372,416 votes (39.5%).
2014: Nelson was unopposed for both the May 20, 2014 Democratic primary and the November 4, 2014 general election, winning with 9,742 votes.
2012: Nelson was unopposed for the May 22, 2012 Democratic primary and won the November 6, 2012 general election with 8,860 votes (69.6%) against Republican nominee Joshua Howard.
2010: Nelson was unopposed for the May 18, 2010 Democratic primary and the November 2, 2010 general election, winning with 9,202 votes (77.5%) against Republican nominee Barry Carnes, who had run in the Republican primary in 2002.
2008: Nelson was unopposed for both the 2008 Democratic primary and the November 4, 2008 general election, winning with 9,334 votes.
2006: Nelson was challenged in the three-way 2006 Democratic primary, winning with 4,239 votes (63.1%) and won the November 7, 2006 general election with 10,253 votes (78.1%) against Republican nominee Glynna Brown.
2004: Nelson was unopposed for both the 2004 Democratic primary and the November 2, 2004 general election, winning with 9,095 votes.
2002: Nelson was unopposed for the 2002 Democratic primary and won the November 5, 2002 general election with 8,017 votes (67.1%) against Republican nominee Timothy Lasley.
2000: When Representative Ausmus left the Legislature and left the seat open, Nelson was unopposed for the 2000 Democratic primary and won the November 7, 2000 general election with 5,853 votes (52.3%) against Republican nominee Scott Madon.
1998: When district 87 Representative Michael Bowling left the Legislature and left the seat open, Nelson ran as an Independent in the three-way November 3, 1998 general election, but lost to Republican nominee J.C. Ausmus lll.

References

External links
Official page at the Kentucky general Assembly

Rick Nelson at Ballotpedia
Rick G. Nelson at OpenSecrets

1954 births
Living people
Eastern Kentucky University alumni
Democratic Party members of the Kentucky House of Representatives
People from Harlan County, Kentucky
People from Middlesboro, Kentucky
21st-century American politicians